Ctenophryne minor is a species of frog in the family Microhylidae. It is endemic to Colombia and only known from its type locality in the upper Río Saija drainage, Cauca Department. Common name Colombian egg frog has been coined for it.

Description
The type series consists of one subadult female that measures  in snout–vent length. The head is relatively narrow, barely narrower than the body. The snout is essentially rounded with slight indication of a blunt point when seen above and rounded and slightly projecting in lateral view. The canthus rostralis is rounded. The eyes are relatively small. There is no external sign of tympanum. The finger tips are rounded. The toes have flattened tips and are basally to one-half webbed. The coloration is grayish brown dorsally and black laterally, with a pinkish line that extends from the groin to above the eye and onto the canthus rostralis separating them. The dorsum has a few, scattered blotches of paler brown, a few scattered white dots middorsally, and sparse pale blue speckling dorsolaterally. The ventral surfaces are black with some very pale blue spots.

Habitat and conservation
It is a leaf litter species. Males calls from beneath leaf litter and from leaf-litter covered holes in the ground. No major threats to this species have been identified because it occurs in an area of little human impact. It is a rare, secretive species that might occur more widely than currently known.

References

minor
Amphibians of Colombia
Endemic fauna of Colombia
Taxa named by Charles W. Myers
Taxa named by Richard G. Zweifel
Amphibians described in 1989
Taxonomy articles created by Polbot